Charles Harold Scrymgeour (June 15, 1914 – November 24, 2000) was a Canadian curler from Winnipeg, Manitoba. He was the second of the 1942 Brier Champion team (skipped by Ken Watson), representing Manitoba.

References

1914 births
2000 deaths
Brier champions
Canadian male curlers
Curlers from Winnipeg